Chidambaram railway station (Code: CDM) is a railway station situated in Chidambaram, a municipal town and a taluk headquarters in Cuddalore district, Tamil Nadu, India. The station comes under the Tiruchirappalli railway division of the Southern Railway zone and falls on the main line.

Background 

The railhead links the city trains to several cities such as Chennai, Tiruchirappalli, Thanjavur, Kumbakonam, Madurai, Tirupati, Varanasi, Mumbai.

Location and layout
The railway station is located off the Railway feeder Rd, Annamalai Nagar, Chidambaram.

Lines

References

External links
 Southern Railways - Official Website
 

Trichy railway division
Railway stations in Cuddalore district